The Best of Pink Floyd may refer to:
 The Best of the Pink Floyd, a 1970 compilation album
 Echoes: The Best of Pink Floyd, a 2001 compilation album
 The Best of Pink Floyd: A Foot in the Door, a 2011 compilation album